Mumma may refer to:

People
Gordon Mumma (b. 1935), American composer
Kar de Mumma, Swedish theatre producer
Lt. Commander Morton C. Mumma, commander of the USS Sailfish (SS-192) in 1940
Walter M. Mumma (1890–1961), US Congressman from Pennsylvania

Science
8340 Mumma, an asteroid discovered by Edward L. G. Bowell